Frederick Murray Blois (March 30, 1893 – August 3, 1984) was a Canadian politician.

Born in Gore District, Nova Scotia, he was a member of the Nova Scotia House of Assembly for eight years starting in 1937 and was Conservative Party leader and Leader of the Opposition from 1941 until the 1945 provincial election wiped out the party.

Blois ran unsuccessfully for the House of Commons of Canada as the Progressive Conservative candidate in the riding of Colchester—Hants in the 1957 federal election. He lost by 389 votes to the Liberal candidate. In 1960, he was summoned to the Senate of Canada representing the senatorial division of Colchester-Hants, Nova Scotia. He resigned in 1976.

References
 
 

1893 births
1984 deaths
Canadian senators from Nova Scotia
Canadian people of Scottish descent
Progressive Conservative Association of Nova Scotia MLAs
People from Hants County, Nova Scotia
Progressive Conservative Party of Canada candidates for the Canadian House of Commons
Candidates in the 1957 Canadian federal election
Acadian people
Nova Scotia political party leaders